Rochele Jesus Nunes (born 19 June 1989) is a heavyweight judoka from Brazil who represents Portugal. She won one silver and three bronze medals at the Pan American Judo Championships from 2013 to 2016.

References

External links

 

1989 births
Living people
Sportspeople from Rio Grande do Sul
Brazilian female judoka
Portuguese female judoka
Universiade medalists in judo
S.L. Benfica (martial arts)
Universiade gold medalists for Brazil
Universiade silver medalists for Brazil
Judoka at the 2019 European Games
European Games medalists in judo
European Games silver medalists for Portugal
Medalists at the 2013 Summer Universiade
Judoka at the 2020 Summer Olympics
Olympic judoka of Portugal
Portuguese people of Brazilian descent